Sagrado Corazón  and Monteflores  are two contiguous neighborhoods with similar characteristics formerly known as the Alto de Ubarri and part of Santurce's 40 subbarrios. Sagrado Corazón measures 0.34 km² (345,472 m²), with a resident population of 1,646 while Monteflores measures 0.17 km² (172,397 m²), with a resident population of 1,657, both as of the 2000 United States Census.

Sagrado Corazón and Monteflores are situated on the highest of Santurces' 5 hills, Monteflores, which reaches a height of 23 meters (75 feet), and enjoys amazing vistas and breezes, its borders are Borinquen Avenue to the south, Ponce of León Avenue and San Jorge Street to the west, Tapia Street to the east and to the north San Mateo Street and Eduardo Conde Avenue (Old Seboruco Road) bordering the Villa Palmeras subbarrio.

This area was urbanized in the first decades of the twentieth century with residences that belonged to the privileged families of the time and is rich in architectural styles. Renowned architect Antonín Nechodoma located his residence in Monteflores and some residences designed by him are still in the area.

Unique French-style neoclassic architectural characteristics of the University of the Sacred Heart (Universidad del Sagrado Corazón) where the residence of Pablo Ubarri, Count of Santurce, was located also abound along with Puerto Rican adaptations of Victorian architecture, there are also homes in the "tropical" U.S influenced Mission Revival, French-gothic, Spanish Colonial Revival, Prairie School, and several apartment structures of the "Art Deco" periods in Bouret street.

Nowadays. modern high rise apartment buildings dot the area. Sagrado Corazón station is the starting point of the "Tren Urbano" (Urban Train). Various bus lines (guaguas) operate in the area as well.

Gallery

See also
 
 List of communities in Puerto Rico

References

Bibliography
 Puerto Rican Houses in Sociohistorical Perspective Author; Carol F. Jopling - (1988)The University of Tennessee, Knoxville.  / 

Santurce, San Juan, Puerto Rico
Municipality of San Juan